The Portland Symphony Orchestra was established in 1923 in Portland, Maine as the Amateur Strand Symphony Orchestra. Started by a small group of musicians who had sent out invitations to join their organization to people in the area, they had their first rehearsal the following year with 75 instrumentalists, giving their first concert a month later at the Strand Theater. In 1927 the orchestra changed its name to the Portland Municipal Orchestra, and again in 1932 to the Portland Maine Symphony. In 1969, the orchestra's name was changed to the Portland Symphony Orchestra, after that name became available when an older orchestra in Portland, Oregon, relinquished it in favor of a new name.
Today the Portland Symphony Orchestra is recognized to be one of the top orchestras of its size in the country. The concert season runs from September to May and during July, and performs a variety of concerts in their home concert hall Merrill Auditorium.

Conductors
The Portland Symphony Orchestra has had 13 main conductors since its establishment in 1923. Its first conductor was the city of Portland's organist, Charles Raymond Cronham, from 1927 to 1932. During his tenure, he extended rehearsals and the concert schedule. He also inaugurated out-of-town concerts such as the performance at Bowdoin College in January 1928. Volunteers and musicians transported the orchestra and all its instruments, including two pianos.
 
In 1933, a school of music supervisor, Charles A. Warren, from Brunswick took over for a year.

From 1935–1937, Paul E. Melrose was the main conductor. He was part of the 5th US Infantry Band at Fort Williams as the Warrant Officers and Band Leader.

Dr. Russell Ames Cook was the first out-of-state conductor. An outgoing man, he befriended the "leading families" of the orchestra, and they helped him get support. During his tenure, 1938–1951, there was an increase in donations, supporters, and volunteers which were all essential to its success.

In 1952, the concertmaster and associate conductor of the Boston Symphony Orchestra, Richard Burgin, became the PSO's conductor. His legacy was to help improve the string section.

Rouben Gregorian took over in 1958, after Burgin's administration ended. He was a graduate of Central College in Iran, where he had been the co-founder and conductor of the Tehran Symphony Orchestra. As the main conductor of the Portland Symphony Orchestra, he finalized the enactment of a fully paid orchestra in 1959.

In 1962, Arthur Bennett Lipkin began his tenure. He was the first resident conductor and began the Youth concerts. The orchestra was involved with Voice of America broadcasts, including a broadcast to Kyoto, Japan.

From 1967–75, Paul Vermal was the main conductor. He conducted a five-day Canadian Tour. He also introduced outdoor concerts and concert previews.

The Portland Symphony Orchestra developed a national reputation for its artistic quality during Bruce Hangen's subsequent tenure. He helped expand educational programs which attracted children of all ages. He also created and developed the Portland Symphony Chamber Orchestra. His administration lasted from 1976–1986.

Toshiyuki Shimada took over in 1986. He tightened the orchestra's grasp of symphonic masterworks and deepened its commitment to youth and family programming, while building higher on the firm music foundations left by his predecessors.

Robert Moody was the 12th Music Director of the Portland Symphony from 2008-2018. He was a champion of new music, particularly the work of Mason Bates, and began the Discovery Concert series for families.

Eckart Preu has been named the 13th Music Director of the Portland Symphony and began his tenure as Music Director in the 2019-2020 season.

1956-1958 Guest Conductors:
Samuel Seineger
Rouben Gregorian
Attilio Poto
Francis Findlay

1966-1967 Guest Conductors:
Charles Gabor
Elyakum Shapiro
Maurice Kaplow
Andrew Galos
Andrew Galos
Paul Vermel

1975-1976 Guest Conductors:
Michael Palmer
Michael Charry
Claude Monteux
Bruce Hangen
Maurice Kaplow
Richard Williams
Tibor Pusztai

1985-1986 Guest Conductors:
Robert Bernhardt
Toshiyuki Shimada
Robert Page
Catherine Comet
Paul Polivnick

References

External links
Official site
PortTIX Box Office 
Seating Chart for Merrill Auditorium

American orchestras
Musical groups established in 1923
Musical groups from Portland, Maine
Wikipedia requested audio of orchestras
Performing arts in Maine